Mac Eoin, MacEoin or McEoin is an Irish surname. Notable people with the surname include:

Denis MacEoin (born 1949), Irish editor
Gearóid Mac Eoin (born 1929), Irish academic
Seán Mac Eoin (1893–1973), Irish politician
Tomás Mac Eoin (born 1937), Irish singer
Owen MacEoin Dubh MacAlister (?–1571), Chief of Clan MacAlister
Athairne Mac Eoghain (1200–1600), Irish poet

See also
Mac Eoin Bissett family

Surnames of Irish origin
Patronymic surnames
Surnames from given names